is a retired Japanese long jumper. He competed at the 2015 World Championships in Beijing without qualifying for the final.
 
His personal best in the event is 8.18 metres (+1.3 m/s) set in Walnut in 2015.

Personal bests

Competition record

National titles
Japanese Championships
Long jump: 2008, 2010, 2011, 2015

References

External links
 
 
 Yohei_Sugai at Mizuno Track Club  (archived)
 

Living people
1985 births
Place of birth missing (living people)
Sportspeople from Tochigi Prefecture
Japanese male long jumpers
Asian Games competitors for Japan
Athletes (track and field) at the 2010 Asian Games
World Athletics Championships athletes for Japan
Japan Championships in Athletics winners
20th-century Japanese people
21st-century Japanese people